DYII (92.7 FM), broadcasting as Bee 92.7, is a radio station owned by Vimcontu Broadcasting Corporation and operated by Groove Deejayz Entertainment Solutions. The station's studio and transmitter are located along Maria Clara St., Tagbilaran.

The station was launched on February 8, 2016 as Magic 92.7 under an affiliation of Quest Broadcasting, Inc., before it was later relaunched under its current brand on September 7, 2018.

References

External links
Bee 92.7 FB Page

Contemporary hit radio stations in the Philippines
Radio stations established in 2017
Tiger 22 Media Corporation
Radio stations in Bohol